Joachim Kemmer (September 12, 1939 – April 26, 2000) was a German actor, cabaret artist, singer, and voice actor. He appeared in more than seventy films from 1969 to 2000.

He did dubbing work for many German language versions of Disney animated films, voicing Sebastian in The Little Mermaid, Wilbur in The Rescuers Down Under, Lumiere in Beauty and the Beast, Jafar in Aladdin, Rafiki in The Lion King and Ratcliffe in Pocahontas.

Personal Life and death 
Kemmer died on April 26, 2000 at Vienna, Austria the age of 60 the cause of death of heart failure

Selected filmography
 The Vampire Happening (1971), as Friar Martin
 Welcome in Vienna (1986), as Lt. Binder
  (1986), as Kretschmar
 The Cat (1988), as Voss
  (1990), as Strobeck
 Pakten (1995), as Madina
 An Ambiguous Report About the End of the World (1997), as Johannes Christof

References

External links 

1939 births
2000 deaths
People from Brandenburg an der Havel
German male film actors
German male television actors
German male voice actors
20th-century German male actors
Deaths from cancer in Austria
Deaths from lung cancer